Football Far North Coast (FFNC) is the governing body controlling Association Football on the Far North Coast of New South Wales, Australia. The name of the organization was changed in late 2005 from Soccer Far North Coast in line with the national governing body which changed from Soccer Australia to Football Federation Australia.

FFNC is governed by Northern New South Wales Football, which is one of two organisations governing state level association football (soccer) in New South Wales (the other being Football New South Wales). There are nine senior men's leagues, from the Premier League to the League Seven and six senior women's leagues - Women's Premier League to League Five. The top league controlled by Football Far North Coast is the Premier League, of which 8 teams currently compete. The team who finishes last in the Premier are relegated to the Men's Championship League.

Men's Premier League/First Division history

2021 — The COVID-19 Season Take 2
Like 2020 the 2021 season was impacted by COVID-19 with the number of fixtures reduced and finals cancelled.

In April South Lismore won their first ANZAC Day Cup, defeating Byron Bay 3-1 in the final.  It was an emotional win for South Lismore as Cameron Hyde their much-loved former coach had passed away in the week leading up to the game.  Goalscorers for South Lismore were Murray Towner (2) and Bodhi Estreich with Diego Vazquez slotting home a late penalty for Byron Bay.  Harrison Armstrong (South Lismore) was named player of the match.

Also in April Byron Bay won the Callan McMillan Memorial Shield, defeating Lennox Head 2-0 in the final.  Ali Dean (Byron Bay) was named player of the match.

In August the Men's premiership was postponed due to COVID-19, and in September following advice from the NSW government that community sport wouldn't be able to recommence it was announced that the season had concluded.  Given the circumstances it was a miracle that 16 of the 18-game season was played, although the finals were cancelled meaning there were no grand final winners.

It was a triumphant return to coaching for Brian Bugden, former Richmond Rovers coach and player who led the rejuvenated club from last in a COVID-shortened 2020 season to their 10th Premier League premiership.  Bugden was named Premier League coach of the year.

2021 Men's Premier League Final Table

2020 — The COVID-19 season
The commencement of fixtures for the 2020 season was delayed until July by the COVID-19 pandemic and the season reduced to 10 games, with clubs playing up to 3 games per week to fit in the shortened season.

In December 2019 Byron Bay announced Belinda Wilson, former Brisbane Roar W-League and Young Matildas coach would coach the Byron Bay Premier Division side for the 2020 season. This was the first time a female coach had been appointed to an FFNC Premier Division club.

Maclean made a return to Premier League after last playing in FFNC competitions in 2007.

In September Goonellabah won their 5th ANZAC Day Cup, beating Alstonville 2-1 after extra time (1-1 at full-time) in a dramatic game at Crawford Park, Alstonville. For Goonellabah Chris Clarke slotted home a penalty in the first half. Jesse Fryer equalised for Alstonville with a brilliant strike from 25 metres with 10 minutes of normal time remaining. Just 3 minutes into extra-time, Reggie Sharp scored to give Goonellabah a 2–1 lead, and despite sustained Alstonville pressure, Goonellabah held on to win the ANZAC Cup.

South Lismore won their second Premier League premiership, losing just once to Bangalow. South Lismore's previous premiership was in 1993 when they won the premiership-Cyril Mayo Cup double. The seasons quiet achievers were Alstonville who made the finals for the first time since 2014 and by coming 3rd achieved their highest-ever placing, surpassing their 4th place in 1986.

Men's Premier League 2020 Final Table

History of Association Football in Northern NSW

1911 – First Evidence
There is evidence of "Soccer enthusiasts" from the Oakland area meeting at Muldoon's Hotel in June 1911 to form a football association.

The first known game played under the British Association rules saw Oakland defeat Coraki on Saturday 8 July 1911.

The first football club formed in the Lismore area was the Lismore Athletic Football Club which was formed at the Lismore School of Arts in May 1914. The first game of football featuring a side from Lismore was played in June 1914 when students from the Wollongbar Experiment Farm played Lismore Athletic Soccer Club at the farm. The Lismore Athletic team was:

 Goalkeeper - Blackmore
 Backs - Newman and Caley
 Half-backs - Cochrane, Manning (captain), Alcock
 Forwards - Marshall, Stewart, Hope, Thomas & McBeth

The officials for the game were Mr Priestly (referee) and Mr R Hatt (linesman).

1932 – First Lismore Club & Competition

The first Lismore club (it's possible that the Lismore Athletic Soccer Club of 1914 was a team only) was established in April 1932 at a meeting at the Golden Globe rooms. At that meeting, it was noted the club had 34 players and "the support of prominent Lismore citizens, including representatives of two churches"; Canon Moore (Church of England) and Reverend Parker (Presbyterian). The club adopted club colours of red and blue shirts and white shorts, and decided to enter a team in Bangalow's Association premiership competition that was initially supposed to include 6 teams:

 Bangalow (2 teams)
 McLeans Ridges
 Federal
 Mullumbimby
 Lismore

Only 3 teams nominated for the initial competition of the Northern Rivers Soccer Football Association with additional teams from Lismore, Ballina and McLeans Ridges being invited to compete in the end of season knockout competition:

 Bangalow Rangers
 Lismore AFC
 Federal

In May 1932 Lismore announced they had rented "An area of land at the corner of Diadem and Magellan streets" for use as a home ground.

The first game in the competition was played at Bangalow on Saturday, 14 May 1932 with Bangalow defeating Lismore 3–1. The teams were:

 Bangalow: Morrison, Graham, Hunt, Ramsden, W Turner, Macdonald, Jeffert, A Carter, Davies, Eldridge, J Carter
 Lismore: Fender, Williamson, Green, Daly, Holmes, Gilmour, Kinch, G Wightman, McCredie, Simpson, Temperley

New clubs were formed in Lismore in May and Casino in July 1932. The new Lismore club was probably called Lismore City.

In July 1932 an Association Cup competition attracted 6 teams: Bangalow, Lismore City, Casino, Dyraaba, Lismore & Federal.

Le Clare Cup
Football continued being played on a social basis and then on a more organised basis for the Le Clare Cup until 1939.

1949 Revival
Association Football in the Lismore district was revived after a 10-year hiatus in early 1949 by Constable Ossie (Oscar) Pomroy, a local policeman and Jack Connolly, a repatriation representative. Pomroy had played association football with the Police team in the Sydney competition.
On Saturday 30 April 1949 the first competition game for 1949 was played at Lismore Recreation Ground between two under-16 teams; Brisbane Telegraph Rangers and Lismore Boys’ Hostel. In May 1949 a club was formed in Casino. The first senior game of the season was played at Lismore Recreation Ground on Saturday 28 May between a Lismore team and a Casino team with Lismore winning 4–1. The Casino team featured former Dutch international, Jack Dalmeyer.
In June 1949 the Lismore and District Soccer Football Association, a predecessor to the current Football Far North Coast, was formed. The inaugural office bearers were:

 Patrons: Larry Anthony, Commonwealth member for Richmond and William Frith, NSW member for Lismore
 President: Maurice Guilmant
 Vice-Presidents: R Hatt, C Lawman, J Robertson, Frank Oakes, Clarrie Richards, Ossie Pomroy, RM Frazer
 Secretary: RT McBain
 Treasurer: GJ Wightman
 Publicity Officer: Ossie Pomroy

The under-16 competition played for the Wilcher Cup donated by Wilcher's Dye Works of Keen Street, Lismore with 12 teams from 7 clubs competing:
1. North Lismore – Hotspurs, Thistle
2. East Lismore – Rovers, Athletic
3. South Lismore – Celtic, Albion
4. Hostel – United, Wanderers
5. Goonellabah Stars
6. Telegraph Rangers
7. City Rangers

North Lismore Hotspurs were the inaugural winners of the Wilcher Cup with South Lismore Celtic winning the junior cup final.

In seniors 5 teams participated in the competition:

1. Lismore City
2. North Lismore Marauders	
3. Goonellabah Gold Stars
4. Methodist OK	
5. Casino Rebels
	
Lismore City were the winners of the Challenge Cup which appears to have been the equivalent of the grand final, beating Casino 5–1 in the final.
In September 1949 a Far North Coast representative team played Corinthians, the 1949 Brisbane soccer premiers. The game was played at Lismore Recreation Grounds, with Corinthians winning 7–1.

1950 – Formation of Eastwood United

At a meeting in February 1950 Eastwood United was established comprising 2 junior teams (Under 14 and 18) and 1 senior team. It was agreed that club colours would be red shirts with white collars, pockets and sleeves, white shorts and red and white socks. The inaugural elected officials were:

 Patron – Dr RE Longworth
 President – Mr M (Maurice) Guilmant
 Secretary – Mr M Glendinning
 Assistant secretary – Mr E Wells
 Treasurer – Mr J Harrison
 Publicity Officer – Mr OH (Ossie) Pomroy

1950 Brand Cup Final (Casino Rebels win the Final But Not the Cup!)

The 1950 Arthur Brand Cup Final between Eastwood United and Casino Rebels was played on Saturday, 9 September at the Lismore Recreation Ground (Recreation Ground Number 1). The game was of a high standard with Eastwood United winning 2–1 after extra time and being presented with the cup by Arthur Brand. Casino Rebels protested the result to the Lismore District Soccer Football Association (LDSFA) on the grounds that the refereeing of Mr Des Hyde had not been up to standard, and demanded a replay. In particular, it was reported Casino Rebels players 'began to leave the field when a goal ... (by their captain, Stan Pendrigh) ... was disallowed' and the legitimacy of Eastwood United's winning goal which had been scored direct from an indirect free-kick. The LDSFA upheld (supported) Casino Rebels protest and directed the final be replayed at Casino on Saturday, 23 September. Mr Stan Jarrett, the Secretary of the LDSFA resigned in protest at the decision. Eastwood United refused to play the re-match so the matter was referred to the NSW Soccer Association.

The re-match was eventually played at Casino on Saturday 30 September with Casino Rebels winning 2–0. The NSW Soccer Association ruled the 'referee's decision was final' (in relation to the first game) and as a consequence, the LDSFA decided Eastwood United would hold the cup for the next 12 months. So whilst Casino Rebels won the 1950 Brand Cup Final, Eastwood United had possession of the cup.

The Casino Rebels team for the re-match was:

 A Morgan (Goalkeeper), Stan Pendrigh (Captain), Jack Dalmeyer, L Fryer, G Snow, W Richardson, M De Haan, H Johns, F Koning, M Day, J Davy, J McElligott

The Eastwood United squad for the re-match was:

 H Pogulis (Goalkeeper), Jim Brady, S De Vries, Billy Stark, Ossie Pomroy (Captain), Billy Driver, L Moller, Bill Woolnough, J Docherty, J Felicia, N Manitta, Cliff Burrows, M Nutt, N Garrett

1951 Brand Cup Final 'the longest match in history ...'

The Brand Cup donated by Arthur Brand, a local pharmacist, was an end-of-season competition played on a knock-out basis. The 1951 Brand Cup final was between North Lismore Marauders and Methodist United. The first game, played on Saturday 25 August, was abandoned at 5:45 pm due to bad light after more than 2 hours play. The teams had played 90 minutes of normal time, and 2 sets of 20 minutes extra time. The score was 2-all at full time and 2-all when the game was abandoned. Goalscorers for North Lismore Marauders were S Miles and Cyril Mayo, whilst A Watson scored both goals for Methodist United. The game attracted more than 1,000 and possibly up to 1,500 fans with gate proceeds of more than 100 pounds being donated to the North Coast Children's Home.

The replay was played on Saturday 15 September. Both clubs made changes with North Lismore Marauders bringing in forwards Dirk Brouwer and Bill Owens, and Methodist United including local baseball star Reg Baxter. Owens, who had been called up for army training was given special leave to play and flown in specially for the game. North Lismore Marauders won the replay 3–1 and their only-ever trophy in Lismore football history. Goalscorers for North Lismore Marauders were ironically, Bill Owens (2) and Dirk Brouwer, whilst Allan Halls scored for Methodist United.

1951 – Establishment of Breakaway Casino District Soccer Association
In March 1951 following a decision by the Lismore District Soccer Association to limit its boundaries to a radius of 25 miles from the Lismore Post Office, there were murmurings of a breakaway association centred on Casino. The proposed new association would encompass juniors and up to 7 senior teams: Casino (2), Bonalbo (2), Mallanganee, Dyraaba and Kyogle.

1954 – Drowning of LDSA Secretary, Cliff Burrows
In July 1950 the Caledonians club from Brisbane visited Lismore to play the Far North Coast representative side. Cliff Burrows, a member of the Caledonians side was so impressed by Lismore that he returned to live there. Burrows, originally from the Leeds area in England, played for Eastwood United from 1950 to 1953 and was captain of the Church of Christ Crusaders side in 1954. Burrows was good enough to play for the Lismore City and Lismore representative sides against the Sutherland Shire Casuals and Grafton in 1954. Burrows also refereed.

In June 1954 Burrows was elected Secretary of the Lismore District Soccer Association (LDSA) following the resignation of Mr Allan Halls. In September the same year, tragedy struck when Burrows drowned whilst surfing at Ballina Lighthouse Beach. Burrows was buried at Lismore Memorial Gardens on Skyline Road, Goonellabah.

The LDSA opened a fund to condition his grave and provide a suitable epitaph. In September 1955 a memorial was unveiled at Burrows' grave.

1957 – Visit by Eastern Athletic (Hong Kong)
In July 1957 a team described in the local press as the Chinese national team but actually Eastern Athletic from Hong Kong visited Lismore to play a Lismore District Soccer Association XI. This was the first time an International or State side had visited the Northern Rivers region of NSW. Eastern Athletic were a good side; in the week before playing the Lismore XI they drew 2-all with Australia and beat Queensland 5–3 in Brisbane.

The week leading up to the game was marred by injury. Firstly, the referee assigned to the game, Allan Halls from Lismore, was concussed in a car accident and there was some doubt he would take charge of the match. Secondly, Bill Smith the captain and central defender of the Lismore XI was injured playing for his club, Eastwood United the weekend before the game, and forced to withdraw. Bill Mullins of Grafton replaced Smith as captain.

Eastern Athletic soundly defeated the Lismore XI 6–0 at Oakes Oval, Lismore after it was 4–0 at half-time. The visitors put on a "display of precision football" on "a wet, slippery ground" with a "greasy ball" in front of a crowd of 1,500 ("the largest crowd ever to see soccer on the Northern Rivers") paying £300. According to the local newspaper the best players for the Lismore XI were R Parkhouse, Bill Mullins, Eric Moss (the youngest player in the team at 17 years of age), Charlie Kostic & L Orchard.

The Lismore XI, selected from the Lismore region and including players from Grafton and Casino was:

 R Parkhouse (Grafton, Goalkeeper), Gary Kuehne (Grafton), Bill Mullins (Grafton, Captain), Eric Moss (Grafton), Charlie Kostic (Grafton), L Orchard (Eastwood United, Lismore), Barry Neaves (Eastwood United, Lismore), B McPherson (Goonellabah Stars, Lismore), A Lee (Goonellabah Stars, Lismore), W van Beers (Casino) and F Laing (Grafton)

The match officials were:

 Referee - Allan Halls
 Linesmen - K Goudie, G Hayward

Eastern Athletic exists to this day, re-badged as Eastern Sports Club and currently playing in the Hong Kong Premier League.

1958 – Formation of Lismore Thistles
On Friday 31 January 1958 a meeting was held at the Boy's Hostel in Lismore to form a new club to play in Lismore & District Soccer Football Association competitions.

The meeting appointed Warren Bancroft as chairman. Others present at the meeting were to become stalwarts of the Lismore Thistles club including John Ryan, Barry Neaves, Lance Goldsmith, Nooky Lavis and Jim Rixon.

The meeting also agreed on:

 A club name - Thistles Soccer Club
 Club colours - Royal blue & white
 Club emblem - A thistle within a shield

In 1958, Lismore Thistles first season it had 1 team with twenty registered players playing in the First Division.

1961 – Formation of Richmond Rovers

In 1960 Goonellabah Stars won the treble of ANZAC Cup, Premiership and grand final (or Championship for the Cyril Mayo Memorial Cup). Goonellabah Stars beat Lismore Thistles 4–3 in the grand final to win the Cyril Mayo Memorial Cup; the goalscorers being Goonellabah Stars - E Scurr, Earle McPherson, Athol Parmenter and Bill Harris (Captain), and for Lismore Thistles - R Lavis 3 goals. This was the third time in succession Goonellabah Stars had won the Cyril Mayo Memorial Cup since its donation in 1958.

In 1961 Irishman Bill Harris left Goonellabah Stars, the most successful club in the competition, to form a new club; Richmond Rovers. Harris' motivation was to "foster younger players ... create more interest in the code by expanding the competition, which he saw as lopsided due to Goonellabah Stars dominance". Harris was a former Irish schoolboy representative and English 1st Division player who had moved to Lismore in 1957 via Melbourne (where he played for Slavia).

Richmond Rovers became the 5th team in the Senior competition joining Casino Rovers, Eastwood United, Goonellabah Stars and Lismore Thistles. In their first game, an ANZAC Cup-tie, Richmond Rovers were beaten 7–0 by Lismore Thistles and in their first fixture game were beaten 2–1 by Casino Rovers. In its first season Richmond Rovers also fielded 2 junior teams; an Under-16 and an Under-14.

Members of the original Richmond Rovers side were: John Gava, Carl Ross, J Handley, David Flynn, D Cassis, M Bright, John Morrissey, Bill Harris, John Serone, G Perkins, John Farry (goalkeeper), Doug Edwards, Theo Donaldson, Barry Neaves and Arthur Maloney.

1961 – Visit by Fijian National Team
In May and June 1961 the Fijian national team toured the Eastern States of Australia and played regional and State teams including a North Coast team at Oakes Oval, Lismore.

On Sunday 4 June in "greasy, treacherous conditions" the Fijians were "too fast" for the locals, winning 8–2 after it was 5–0 at half-time. Jim Smith scored both goals for the North Coast. Officials voted R Helmond, the North Coast goalkeeper as the best of the local players, whilst the local newspaper also praised Eddie Laycock (right back) and Jim Smith (centre forward). The game was watched by a crowd of 2,500

The local newspaper noted the North Coast captain Bill Harris (born in Northern Ireland) was the only North Coast player not born in Australia. The team included 8 players from Lismore, 2 from Murwillumbah and 1 from Macksville:

 R Helmood (goalkeeper), Eddie Laycock (right back), J Craven (left back), Bill Smith (right half and Vice-Captain), Earl McPherson (centre half), Ron Fiore (left half), B Dawson (outside right), Bill Harris (inside right and Captain), Jim Smith (centre forward), Ron Phillips (inside left) and E Crooks (outside left). Reserves were R Burns, J Gassner, W Van Meurick, A Parmenter and G Lavis.

The Fijians played 15 games on tour, winning 8, drawing 1 and losing 6 whilst scoring 76 goals and conceding 65. Some of the games against regional sides were cricket scores: Fiji 14 - Riverina 0 (in Wagga Wagga), Fiji 12 - Goulburn Districts 1 (in Goulburn), Fiji 9 - Murrumbidgee Irrigation Area 2 (in Griffith).

1966 – Fall of Goonellabah Stars (1949-65)

Goonellabah Stars, sometimes referred to as Goonellabah Gold Stars were established in 1949 and were part of the revival of football in the Lismore district after a 10-year absence. In its first season Goonellabah Stars fielded a senior team and an Under 16 team in the Wilcher Cup competition. Goonellabah Stars were the dominant club during their 17 years in senior competitions, with some of the region's best players and winning honours on 26 occasions:

 9 ANZAC Cups - 1952, 1953, 1954, 1955, 1956, 1957, 1960, 1963, 1964
 10 premierships - 1951, 1952, 1953, 1955, 1957, 1958, 1960, 1962, 1963, 1964
 7 grand finals - 1954, 1955, 1956, 1958, 1959, 1960, 1962

In 1966 Goonellabah Stars seniors suddenly disappeared, although they continued as a junior club.

1949 season

In their first season in 1949 Goonellabah Stars went trophyless coming 4th in the premiership (in a 5-team competition) and getting knocked out of the finals series by Lismore City. Players in the 1949 season included: K Packham (captain), J Teale, N Manitta, C Wagner, J Roach, L White, L Duff, N Adams, R Allen, A Andrews, K Bryant, J Doyle, R Packham, A Baker.

1953 season – 3rd premiership, 2nd ANZAC Cup

1953 - Final Table - Seniors

1963 season – 9th premiership, 8th ANZAC Cup
In 1963 Goonellabah Stars won their 9th premiership by 1 point from Lismore Thistles. Goonellabah Stars clinched the premiership in the last round of fixtures, beating last-placed Wallaroos 4-2 after Goonellabah Stars were trailing 2-1 until midway through the second half. A goal by 16-year old Robbie Donaldson (making his senior debut) and 2 late goals by Earl McPherson gave Goonellabah Stars the win and the premiership. Goalscorers for Goonellabah Stars were Earl McPherson (hat-trick) and Robbie Donaldson and for Wallaroos J Battese and Geoff Gray.

1963 - Final Table - 1st Division

1964 season - 10th premiership
1964 - Final Table - Seniors

1965 – Eastwood United Wins Premiership-Cyril Mayo Cup Double

1966 – Lismore Thistles win premiership, Eastwood United win Cyril Mayo Cup With Record Score

1969 – Eastwood United win 8th premiership, Italo Stars win 2nd Cyril Mayo Cup

* The Eastwood United team walked-off the field in the 40th minute of the first half after 3 of their players had been sent-off by the referee Jack Pressick in the 30th minute of play. At the time of the walk-off Lismore Thistles were leading 2–0.

1971 – Establishment of Reserve Grade
In 1970 5 teams from 4 clubs competed in Lismore District Soccer Association's senior competition; Eastwood United, Italo Stars, Lismore Thistles A, Lismore Thistles B and Richmond Rovers. In 1971 a Reserve Grade competition was established to give a surplus of senior players a game in the absence of any lower divisions or alternative clubs to the 4 existing Lismore clubs.

The inaugural Reserve Grade competition comprised 5 teams; Casino, Eastwood United, Italo Stars, Lismore Thistles B and Lismore Thistles Green. The first Reserve Grade premiers and grand final winners were Lismore Thistles B who defeated Eastwood United 6–2 in the grand final replay after the first grand final was locked at 3-all after extra time.

The final table, finals results and goalscorers for the 1971 Reserve Grade competition:

1970 to 1974 – Lismore Thistles win every Cyril Mayo Cup (for the grand final)

In 1974 Lismore Thistles created a new record by winning their 5th consecutive Cyril Mayo Cup for winning the grand final. In doing so Lismore Thistles became masters of the finals knock-out format because only once during this period did they win the premiership (in 1973). Lismore Thistles' record was equalled by Italo Stars when they won 5 consecutive Cyril Mayo Cups from 1977 to 1981.

1970 season

Eastwood United won the 1970 premiership their 6th premiership.

* Italo Stars Reserves withdrew from the competition in early-June. All games after their withdrawal have been recorded as a win for their opponent and a 0-0 scoreline.

1971 season

1971 – A-Grade grand final ... "longest grand final in the history of Lismore soccer"
The 1971 A-Grade grand final was both history-making and constitution-changing. Under Lismore District Soccer Association rules of the time it was not possible to have joint champions (grand final winners).

The 1971 A-Grade premiers in a 4-team competition were Eastwood United by 1 point from Lismore Thistles A. The grand final was replayed twice before a winner could be found and was described as a "marathon" and the "longest grand final in the history of Lismore soccer":

 21 August @ Oakes Oval - Lismore Thistles A 4 - Eastwood United 4 after extra time (0-all at half-time, 2-all at full-time). Goalscorers were Terry Woods (3) and Gary Thompson for Lismore Thistles and Dick Morrissey, Dick Latta and John Orchard (2) for Eastwood United.
 28 August @ Oakes Oval - Lismore Thistles A 1 - Eastwood United 1 after extra time (Lismore Thistles led 1–0 at half-time, 1-all at full-time). Goalscorers were Terry Woods for Lismore Thistles and unknown for Eastwood United.
 25 September @ Oakes Oval - Lismore Thistles A 2 defeated Eastwood United 1 (0-all at half-time). Goalscorers were Robert Ellis and Terry Woods for Lismore Thistles and John Orchard for Eastwood United.

The Lismore District Soccer Association committee met after the second draw (and 4 hours and 10 minutes of play) to decide whether to replay the grand final or declare Lismore Thistles A and Eastwood United joint champions. Voting was deadlocked and the then Association president, Jim Underhill used his casting vote to support a replay. As Underhill explained after the meeting, it was unconstitutional to have joint champions.

Incredibly on Saturday, 11 September (between the 1st and 2nd grand final replays) Eastwood United played Italo Stars in the final of the Ampol Silver Ball, winning 5–2. Goalscorers were John Orchard, Dick Morrissey, Dick Latta (2) and Peter Irwin for Eastwood United and Robby Pollock and John Percival for Italo Stars. Eastwood United also won the 1971 ANZAC Cup beating Lismore Thistles A 5–2 in the final. Goalscorers were Peter Keyes (2), Bob Kennedy and Jim Matthews (2) for Eastwood United and Gary Thompson and Bob Lavis for Lismore Thistles.

1972 season

1972 – A Year of Growth

The 1972 season was a year of growth for the Lismore District Soccer Association with a number of new, existing and former clubs being admitted to its competitions. Total player registrations reached 1,681 (120 teams) including 1,435 juniors and 246 seniors. This compared with the Lismore-based Richmond River Junior Rugby League which had 1,250 registered junior players.

In March Richmond Rovers defeated Tumbulgum 1–0 in a women's game and is the first evidence of women's football on the Northern Rivers. A women's competition would be established by the Lismore District Soccer Association in 1974.

New Clubs
 Alstonville - formed in 1972, under-8's only
 Lismore Teachers College - seniors only (Division 2)

Existing Clubs
 Ballina - formed in 1971, 7 junior teams only

Former Clubs
 Casino United (Division 2)
 Casino Rovers (Division 2)
 Nimbin - juniors (3 teams) and seniors (Division 2) re-admitted after some years absence

The A-Grade and Reserve Grade competitions were renamed Division 1 and Division 2 respectively. The number of Division 1 teams increased by 2 to 6 with the admission of South Lismore and Lismore Thistles fielding 2 teams and the number of Division 2 clubs increased by 5 (Casino United, Casino Rovers, Goonellabah, Lismore Teachers College and Nimbin returning after an absence of some years) to make a 10-team competition.

The Division 1 trophies were shared around:

 Eastwood United retained the ANZAC Cup after drawing 2-all with Italo Stars
 Italo Stars won their first premiership since their formation in 1966
 Lismore Thistles defeated Eastwood United 2–1 in the grand final to win their 3rd successive championship. Goalscorers were Michael Clarke and Terry Woods for Lismore Thistles and Jim Matthews for Eastwood United.

The grand final teams were:

Division 2 trophies were won by:

 Premiership - Lismore Thistles Colts
 Grand final – Italo Stars defeated Eastwood United 4-1

1973 – 1st Division Final table and finals results
In 1973 Lismore Thistles won the premiership-grand final double; their 5th premiership and 5th Cyril Mayo Cup after entering senior competitions in 1958. 1973 was their 4th Cyril Mayo Cup (grand final) victory in a row.

Lismore Thistles won the premiership easily from Italo Stars, who were at least 7 points behind. It's unclear the final margin as Italo Stars-Eastwood United's last fixture of the season was forfeited, but it's unclear which club forfeited.

Lismore Thistles lost just once (to Italo Stars 3–0) and drew three times (Richmond Rovers 3-3, Eastwood United 1-1 and 2-2) during the 1973 season:

* The Italo Stars-Eastwood United fixture scheduled to be played 1 September was forfeited, but it's unclear which club forfeited.

1974 Finals Results

1972 – Visit by Dundee FCThe Northern Star, 25 May 1972

In May 1972 Dundee FC toured Australia and New Zealand. On that tour they played Australia in Adelaide (Dundee FC won 2–1), NSW (Dundee FC won 6–1) and Queensland (Dundee FC won 9–0).

Dundee FC played a Northern Rivers representative side at Oakes Oval, Lismore on Wednesday night 24 May 1972. A crowd of more than 4,000 saw Dundee FC beat the locals 16–1 (8–0 at half-time). Some of the adjectives used to describe Dundee FC's performance were "world class" and "incredible". Goal scorers for Dundee FC were Jocky Scott (5), John Gray (3), John Duncan (2), Ian Scott, Bobby Wilson, Duncan Lambie, Doug Houston, Gordon Wallace and George Stewart. The Northern Rivers goal was scored by Gordon Bryant near full-time. Two awards were made to Northern Rivers players after the game - Dick Latta (Lismore Sports & Toy Centre award) and Phillip Bawden (All-Round Sports Centre (Sydney) award).

The Northern Rivers squad for this game was:
 Goalkeeper - Trevor Rainbow (Grafton)
 Fullbacks - John Percival (Captain, Italo Stars, Lismore), Peter Nott (Lismore Thistles), Robbie Donaldson (Richmond Rovers, Lismore)
 Halfbacks - Max Thompson (Lismore Thistles), Terry Woods (Lismore Thistles), Gordon Bryant (Italo Stars, Lismore), Allan Hampton (Grafton)
 Forwards - Devinder Singh (Grafton, although living at Woolgoolga), John Orchard (Eastwood United, Lismore), Dick Morrissey (Eastwood United, Lismore), Phillip Bawden (Italo Stars, Lismore), Dick Latta (Eastwood United, Lismore)
 Coach - Armin Sandmann (Lismore)
Two players were forced to withdraw from the squad in the week leading up to the game due to injury; Ian Monaghan and Kevin Lollback.

Jack Pressick, Secretary of the Northern Rivers Soccer Federation, was the driving force in arranging this game. Pressick, having noted that Dundee FC's itinerary had one unconfirmed date and venue, contacted the Australian Soccer Federation and suggested a match at Lismore. Pressick's suggestion was wholeheartedly supported provided Dundee FC's asking price of $4,500 could be guaranteed. Pressick and Jim Underhill, President of the Lismore District Soccer Association raised the funds from local businesses and businessmen.

1974 – Women's Football Arrives
In May 1974 the Lismore District Soccer Association approved its first women's competition. Six teams nominated including:

 Lismore Thistles
 College of Advanced Education (CAE)/Teacher's College
 Lismore High School
 St Vincent's Hospital

The historic first game in a 10-game season was played on Saturday, 25 May 1974 at Richmond River High School with CAE/Teacher's College beating Lismore Thistles 3–0. Goalscorers for CAE/Teacher's College were D Allen, L Worland and G Schubert.

1977 to 1981 – Italo Stars win every Cyril Mayo Cup (for the grand final)

From 1977 to 1981 Italo Stars won every Cyril Mayo Cup (for winning the grand final) and in doing so equalled Lismore Thistles record of 5 successive Cyril Mayo Cups (from 1970 to 1974). During this 5-year period Italo Stars also won every ANZAC Cup and 2 premierships in 1977 and 1978:

 Treble (ANZAC Cup, Premiership, Cyril Mayo Cup (for the grand final)) - 2 in 1977 and 1978
 Cup Double (ANZAC Cup, Cyril Mayo Cup) - 5 in 1977, 1978, 1979, 1980, and 1981
 Premiership-Grand final Double - 2 in 1977 and 1978

1977 – 1st & 2nd Division Final Table

1978 – 1st Division Final Table

1979 – 1st Division Final Table & Cyril Mayo Knock-out Cup Results

1980 – Lismore Plays Wellington (New Zealand)
In September 1980 a Lismore side played Wellington (New Zealand) at Oakes Oval. The Wellington side included 4 New Zealand internationals; Barry Pickering (goalkeeper who made the New Zealand squad for the 1982 World Cup in Spain), Keith Barton (defender), Jeff Strom (defender) and Michael Simeonoff (midfielder). The weekend before the Lismore game, Wellington beat Clarence Valley 5–0 in Grafton before a crowd of 300. Wellington defeated Lismore 4–0, the goalscorers being Paul Vanderbreggen and Costa Leonadis (hat-trick).

The Lismore squad and officials for the game were:

1981 – Eastwood United Premiership, Italo Stars Cyril Mayo Cup

1982 – Eastwood United win premiership & Ballina make finals for first time

1983 – Goonellabah Wins Their First Premiership & ANZAC Cup
After being formed as a junior club in 1969, Goonellabah first entered a senior team in the 1972 Division 2 competition, coming 2nd last. In 1982 they came 2nd last in First Division. 1983 would be a break-out year as they won the ANZAC Cup and 1st Division premiership for the first time with virtually the same team as 1982.

In April Goonellabah won their first ANZAC Cup 1–0 against Eastwood United with Robert Pearce scoring with full-time looming.

The 1983 premiership was a season-long race between Goonellabah and the defending premiers Eastwood United. Going into the final round the Armin Sandmann coached Goonellabah led by 2 points needing a win against 3rd-placed Lismore Thistles to be certain of their first premiership. Goonellabah won 1-0 (goalscorer - Andy Acton) making Eastwood United's 9-1 thrashing of South Lismore inconsequential.

Eastwood United had revenge when they defeated Goonellabah 3–0 in the major semi-final, the goalscorers being John Wraights, Ken McPherson and Dennis Wiblen. Goonellabah's season came to an end when beaten 1-0 by Lismore Thistles in the preliminary final, the goalscorer being Neil Harris. The Jack Jarvis coached Eastwood United won their 8th grand final defeating Lismore Thistles 2–0 at a windy Oakes Oval, the goalscorers being Darren Laycock and John Wraights.

1984 – A Year of Change

1984 was a year of change with the Lismore District Soccer Association and its committees being replaced by a company, Lismore & District Soccer Pty Ltd and elected board members with responsibility for administering soccer in the Lismore region. In addition two Lismore-based clubs, Italo Stars and South Lismore merged to create a new club, Souths Stars United. Souths Stars United had immediate success, winning the 1984 ANZAC Cup and First Division premiership.

In the ANZAC Cup Souths Stars United defeated Eastwood United 2–1 at Oakes Oval in front of 400 fans and after almost 2 hours of play. Midway through the first half Souths Stars United's Brett Towner pounced on a defensive mix-up to give Souths Stars a 1-0 half-time lead. Eastwood United equalised late in the second half thanks to a Ken McPherson penalty, making it 1-all at full-time. In the first period of extra-time Kevin Wilson headed home the winner to clinch the trophy. Man of the match, selected by referee Dean Mohammed and linesmen Dick Morrissey and Ted Cavanagh, was Brett Towner of Souths Stars United.

The First Division premiership was a two-club race between Souths Stars United and Eastwood United with Souths Stars taking out the trophy by 3 points:

1985 – Eastwood United Becomes Lismore Workers

During the 1985 season Eastwood United became a member of the Lismore Workers Club Sports Trust and from 1 June their senior teams were re-badged as Lismore Workers Soccer Club. To avoid confusion Eastwood United's 10 junior teams retained the Eastwood United name until the 1986 season. Eastwood United joined 18 other sporting clubs including the rugby league club in joining the Lismore Workers Sports Trust.

Lismore Workers Soccer Club retained the same executive as that previously elected at its annual general meeting:

 President - Andy Stevens
 Vice-President - Rod Thomas
 Secretary - Glen Hart
 Treasurer - Janice Ianna

1985 Premier Division Final Table

Eastwood United were defending champions having beaten Souths Stars United on penalties after extra time (2-all at full-time and 3-all after extra time) in the 1984 grand final. Goalscorers in the 1984 grand final were Ken McPherson (2) and Dave Condon for Eastwood United and Hugh Naisby, Peter Jenson and Wayne Storti for Souths Stars United. However, in 1985 Lismore Workers came second to undefeated premiers Lismore Thistles and made the grand final against Lismore Thistles after a new and confusing finals format in which the top 6 teams played 4 semi-final rounds.

In the Lismore Real Estate Premier Division grand final Lismore Thistles completed the 1985 season undefeated and won their 9th championship, beating Lismore Workers 1–0 with a first half goal by Tony Roder.

1986 – Richmond Rovers Celebrate 25 Years With A Premiership-Championship Double

In 1986 Richmond Rovers celebrated 25 years. To add to the celebrations they won the 1986 Premier Division (the Lismore Real Estate Premier Division) premiership and grand final. These were their 2nd premiership (the first was in 1975) and 3rd championship (previous championships were in 1964 and 1975).

Richmond Rovers was established by Bill Harris in 1961 and in their first season fielded 3 teams; a senior men's team and 2 junior teams. By 1986 Richmond Rovers had grown to 22 teams; 5 men's teams, 2 women's teams and 15 junior teams.

Richmond Rovers comfortably won the 10-team premiership by 7 points from a logjam of teams equal on 33 points and only separated by goal difference including Maclean, Lismore Thistles and Alstonvilla:

Richmond Rovers took the hard route to the grand final, being beaten 3–0 in the major semi-final by Lismore Thistles at Oakes Oval (Goalscorers - Phillip Hicks, Steve Morrissey, Mick Riley) before overcoming Mullumbimby 2-1 after extra time in the preliminary final. Mullumbimby scored in the 1st half with a goal by Sulcs and led until deep into the 2nd half before a late Stephen Bugden goal forced the game into extra time. Ian Brown scored Richmond Rovers winner in extra time to give them a grand final berth against Lismore Thistles at Oakes Oval.

The grand final at Oakes Oval was deadlocked 1-all at full-time after first half goals from an Ian Brown header for Richmond Rovers and a Steve Morrissey equaliser for Lismore Thistles. In extra time Richmond Rovers' captain John Bugden hammered home the winner for a perfect finale to their 25th anniversary celebrations.

The squads and coaches for the grand final were:

1987 – Lismore Thistles win premiership, Richmond Rovers win Cyril Mayo Cup

1988 – Italo Stars win premiership-Cyril Mayo Cup Double

* The final game of the season, a deferred game between Lismore Workers and Grafton wasn't played by mutual agreement

1989 – Lismore Workers win premiership-Cyril Mayo Cup Double

1990 – Lismore Workers win 2nd successive premiership-Cyril Mayo Cup Double

1991 – Lismore Thistles win premiership; History Made as Cyril Mayo Cup Shared By Lismore Thistles & Richmond Rovers

1992 – Lismore Thistles Undefeated in Winning Premiership-Cyril Mayo Cup Double

1993 – South Lismore Premiership-Grand final Double

South Lismore established its first senior team in 1972 when they entered the old Division 1 finishing 2nd last in a 6-team competition.

In 1992 South Lismore came 2nd to premiers Lismore Thistles in Premier Division. In their first grand final appearance South Lismore were beaten 2-1 by Lismore Thistles after extra time in the grand final replay after the first game ended 0-0 after extra time.

In 1993 the John Percival coached South Lismore won the Premier Division premiership-grand final double. After winning the premiership for the first (and so far only) time by a point from Lismore Workers after a dramatic final round they won the grand final in similarly dramatic fashion when they defeated Lismore Workers 2-1 after extra time.

Going into the last round of fixtures Lismore Workers were leading South Lismore by a point. In the last round Lismore Workers drew 1–1 with second last-placed Italo Stars and South Lismore defeated Goonellabah 2–0 to win their first ever premiership. The final table was:

South Lismore lost the major semi-final to Lismore Workers 2-1 after extra time before beating Goonellabah 1-0 (Goalscorer - Bruce Mourhaus) after extra time in the preliminary final to make their second successive Premier Division grand final.

The grand final was played under lights at Oakes Oval. Lismore Workers took the lead in the first half thanks to a goal by Tony Marquart. With 2 minutes of normal time remaining Brett Towner scored for South Lismore to force the game into extra time. During extra time a free kick from Troy Percival (South Lismore) was blocked by Lismore Workers' goalkeeper Graham Nesbitt into the path of Brett Towner who scored to give South Lismore a 2–1 win and their first grand final success.

The South Lismore squad for the grand final was:

1994 – Goonellabah win premiership-Cyril Mayo Cup Double

1995 – Goonellabah win premiership-Cyril Mayo Cup Double ... Again

1996 – Lismore Workers win 13th premiership-Richmond Rovers win 6th Cyril Mayo Cup

1997 – Casino Take Cyril Out of Lismore For the First Time in Almost 50 Years
In 1997 Casino won their first grand final and became the first club from outside Lismore to win the Cyril Mayo Cup for the Premier Division championship in almost 50 years. The long-defunct Casino Rebels won the inaugural grand final and the Arthur Brand Cup in 1950 in a disputed grand final replay against Eastwood United.

In 1997 Casino finished on equal points with Lismore Workers (their 14th premiership including 10 as Eastwood United) but second on goal difference in the 12-team Premier Division:

In the major preliminary semi-final Casino defeated Goonellabah 1–0 at a packed Oakes Oval thanks to a Ken Reichmann chip over Goonellabah's goalkeeper Paul Hickey. This game was played as a curtain-raiser to a pre-season Ericcson Cup (National Soccer League) game between Brisbane Strikers and Marconi which attracted more than 5,000 fans.

In the major semi-final at Weston Park, Casino defeated Lismore Workers 1–0 with a first half goal by Dave Hood, and made history by reaching their first ever grand final. Lismore Workers reached the grand final after defeating Goonellabah 1–0 in the preliminary final after a 108th minute extra time goal by Glen Gilchrist.

The grand final between Casino and Lismore Workers was played at a water-logged Oakes Oval. A wild storm including rain, wind and thunder forced the players off the field after 10 minutes of play. After a 40-minute break the players returned to a drenched surface. Casino scored first when sweeper Stewart Coughran drove a free-kick from just outside the penalty box, around the wall and past goalkeeper Justin Marks. Soon after scoring Coughran was stretchered off with an ankle injury, briefly returned but was substituted before half-time and played no further part in the game. With 15 minutes remaining Paul Wiltshire made it 2–0 to Casino when he scored with a "venomous" shot from 20 metres. With 5 minutes to go Lismore Workers scored with a Brad Bosworth headed goal from a corner. But Casino held on to win the grand final 2–1. The player of the match was Casino's Wayne Mortimer.

The squads, coaches and support staff for the grand final were:

1997 – Matildas Beaten by Classy Chinese

In November 1997 the Matildas played China at Oakes Oval, Lismore as part of a Tri-Series involving China, New Zealand and Australia.

A crowd of more than 3,000 saw the Chinese team win 3–0 with the 3 first half goals, the goalscorers being Shui Qingxia, Sun Qingmei and Zhao Lihong. The local press were glowing of the Chinese team ... their "silken touch, ... superb ball skills, such a desire to be the best".

The game was historic because it was the first game China had played in Australia, and for the inclusion of Lismore local Lisa Casagrande in the Australian team. Unfortunately Casagrande was replaced late in the first half due to calf cramps.

In the curtain-raiser the Soccer Far North Coast Under-16 girls team defeated the Coffs Harbour Under-16 girls team 4–1. Goalscorers for Soccer Far North Coast were Martene Edwards (2), Amy Brown and Olivia Brisby with Katrina Byrnes scoring for Coffs Harbour.

The winner of the Matilda for a Day competition run by The Northern Star newspaper including a Matildas playing strip, match ball and spending game day with the team was Kym Butts of South Gundurimba.

1998 – 50th season

1999 – Premiership Leaves Lismore for the First Time Ever
In 1999 Maclean re-wrote FFNC record books by becoming the first club from outside Lismore to win the top grade premiership in its 51-year history. Maclean and Goonellabah finished equal on points, with Maclean's superior goal difference clinching their first premiership.

The 1999 premier division finals (for the Cyril Mayo Cup) were reduced to 4 teams due to time constraints and ground unavailability following a wet season where many games were washed out.

2000 – Italo Stars win premiership-Cyril Mayo Cup Double

2001 – Maclean win premiership-Cyril Mayo Cup Double Including First Cyril Mayo Cup

2001 – Matildas Play France in Lismore
In January 2001 the Matildas played France at Oakes Oval, Lismore. This was the second time the Matildas had played in Lismore, having played China at Oakes Oval in November 1997.

This was the second game in the 3 match Australia Cup series; the first game being played at the Coffs Harbour International Stadium and the final game at Carrara Stadium.

A crowd of 2,350 saw a hard, physical game end in a 1–1 draw. The Matildas took a late lead when in the 86th minute Kim Revell latched onto a through ball from Sharon Black and slipped her shot past the French goalkeeper. France equalised soon after in the 88th minute when Stephanie Mugneret Beghe blasted home after a cut-back from the bye-line.

The curtain-raiser between Soccer Far North Coast Under-17's and New England Under-17's also ended in a 1–1 draw. The goalscorer for Soccer Far North Coast was Hollie Jarrett after great lead-up play by Megan Janezic. Samantha Dowse of Goonellabah won the Matilda For A Day competition run The Northern Star newspaper which included a Matildas playing strip, match ball and spending the day with the Matildas.

2002 – Italo Stars win ANZAC Cup-Premiership Double, Richmond Rovers win Cyril Mayo Cup

2003 – Italo Stars Are Undefeated Premiers & Champions

2004 – Richmond Rovers win premiership, Lismore Workers win First grand final Since 1990

2005 – A season of firsts; Goonellabah wins premiership in their first season back in Premier League, Byron Bay win their first grand final (Cyril Mayo Cup)

2006 – Byron Bay's first premiership-Grand final Double

2007 to 2011 – Richmond Rovers dominate
From 2007 to 2011 Richmond Rovers won 10 of the 15 trophies on offer in Premier League and dominated the competition and opposition clubs:

 ANZAC Shields - 2 in 2008 and 2009
 Premierships - 4 in 2007, 2008, 2009 and 2011
 Grand finals (Cyril Mayo Cup) - 4 in 2007, 2008, 2009 and 2010

In doing so Richmond Rovers won the treble (ANZAC Shield, Premiership and grand final) in 2008 and 2009 and the premiership-Grand final double in 2007, 2008 and 2009.

2007 Premier League table and finals results

 4th premiership, 10th championship

2008 Premier League table and finals results

 5th premiership, 11th championship

* 9 point penalty for crowd misbehavior at the 2007 grand final

2009 Premier League table and finals results

 6th premiership, 12th championship

2010 Premier League table and finals results

 13th championship

2011 Premier League table and finals results

 7th premiership

2012 – Richmond Rovers win premiership, Lismore Workers win First Cyril Since 2004

2013 – Lismore Thistles win ANZAC Shield-Premiership Double

2014 – Byron Bay Premiership, Richmond Rovers Cyril Mayo Cup

2015 – Byron Bay Premiership

2016 – Bangalow Wins Their First Title: Cyril Mayo Cup

In 1987 in their first and until 2016 only grand final appearance Bangalow were convincingly beaten 4-1 by Richmond Rovers. Bangalow had made the grand final from 4th place, beating Alstonvilla (1-0, Goalscorer - Robert Parks), Ballina (2-0, Goalscorer - Paul Clarke (2)) and Lismore Thistles (1-0, Goalscorer - Robert Parks (penalty)).

In 2016 Bangalow won the Premier Division grand final 1–0 against the premiers Goonellabah, to win their first and so far only title.

2016 – Premier Division Final Table & Cyril Mayo Cup Results & venues

2017 – Byron Bay wins the Treble and South Lismore win 1st Division Double

In 2017 Byron Bay won its first ever treble (ANZAC Shield, Premiership & Cyril Mayo Cup) and in doing so became the 8th team to achieve the feat.

In April Byron Bay won the ANZAC Shield beating Richmond Rovers 2–1 in the final at Oakes Oval. Aaron Walker scored both goals for Byron Bay before being sent-off in the 89th minute, whilst Kurt Walker scored for Richmond Rovers in the 65th minute. Joel Wood of Byron Bay was named player of the match.

Byron Bay won the premiership by 2 points from Richmond Rovers, losing only once during the season, a round 17 home loss to Richmond Rovers 1–2. This defeat meant that Byron Bay had to win their final fixture away to Alstonville to secure the premiership. A 5–2 win ensured Byron Bay's 4th premiership.

The Cyril Mayo Cup (grand final) between Byron Bay and defending champions Bangalow was history-making, being contested for the first time ever by 2 clubs from the Byron Shire. It was also the first time since 2001 that both grand finalists were from outside Lismore (in 2001 Maclean defeated Byron Bay in the Cyril Mayo Cup final). And for the first time since 2009 when the grand final was played at Crozier Field; the grand final wasn't played at Oakes Oval due to refurbishments. The game was played at Lismore Workers' home ground, Richards Oval in Lismore. A 10-man Byron Bay won the grand final 2-1 after Ben Ahearn was sent off in the 16th minute and extra time thanks to a double by player-of-the match Joel Wood.

South Lismore were promoted to the 2018 Premier Division after winning the 2017 1st Division premiership by beating Ballina 3–1 at Saunders Oval, Ballina in the final fixture of the season. Going into that final fixture Ballina led South Lismore by 2 points and draw or win would have been enough for Ballina to be promoted. However goals by Kaine Allan (2) and Steve Morrissey in response to a Ben Coulter goal for Ballina gave South Lismore the win and the premiership. South Lismore won the premiership-grand final double by beating Shores United 3–1 in the grand final. South Lismore would be playing in the top division of FFNC competitions for the first time since 2002. South Lismore's 1st Division double was a triumph for their young coach, Cameron Hyde, who overcame a cancer diagnosis to guide his young team back into the Premier Division.

2018 – Lismore Workers & Italo Stars Depart the Premier Division

The 2018 season began with the sad realisation that the 2 most successful clubs in FFNC history, Lismore Workers and Italo Stars, would not be competing in Premier Division. Italo Stars were relegated to 1st Division after coming bottom in the 2017 Premier Division competition whilst Lismore Workers voluntarily opted to play in the Men's lower divisions. Between them Lismore Workers (46 titles, 28 as Eastwood United and 18 as Lismore Workers) and Italo Stars (33 titles) have won 79 titles. Lismore Workers dropped 5 divisions to Division 5 whilst Italo Stars went back 1 division to 1st Division.

South Lismore returned to the Premier Division in 2018 after a 16-year absence after winning the 2017 1st Division premiership-grand final double. With the return of South Lismore, the self-demotion of Lismore Workers and the relegation of Italo Stars, the 2018 Premier Division competition has 9 clubs, a change from the tradition of 10 or even 12 clubs.

In April Lismore Thistles won their 3rd ANZAC Cup in 6 years and their 8th overall, beating Bangalow 3–0 at Crozier Field. Goalscorers were Oscar Stahl, Nick Albertini and Jye Wilson, with Stahl being named player of the match

In May Byron Bay announced that Byron Bay Council had approved its plans for a new clubhouse at its "spiritual home", Byron Recreation Grounds, with the clubhouse expected to be completed in 2019.

In July Richmond Rovers defeated Lennox Head 5–0 away and in doing so wrapped up their 9th premiership with 4 games to play in the 16-game home and away season.

2018 Premier Division – Final Table & Cyril Mayo Cup Results

2019 – Bangalow win First ANZAC Cup, Byron Bay win premiership & South Lismore Break 26 Year Trophy Drought
In April Bangalow won their first ANZAC Cup when they defeated Byron Bay 2-1 after extra time at Crozier Field, Lismore. This was their second trophy in FFNC history following their 2016 Cyril Mayo Cup triumph. Sam Ireland scored the winner for Bangalow in extra time after it was 1–1 at full-time. Goalscorers during normal time were Byron Milne for Bangalow and Ian McKellow for Byron Bay.

The 2019 Premier Division competition kicked off with just 8 clubs including a promoted Ballina which was found to be uncompetitive, losing all 21 games. Byron Bay won their 5th premiership at Nielson Park, East Lismore on a Wednesday night in August when they thrashed a disappointing Richmond Rovers 5–0 in a catch-up game. Byron Bay came from 2nd last after 5 rounds to win their 4th premiership in 6 seasons, winning 14 and losing just 2 of their final 16 fixtures.

South Lismore came second in the premiership but made amends by winning the Cyril Mayo Cup for the first time since their premiership-Cyril Mayo Cup double in 1993. South Lismore defeated premiers Byron Bay 2–1 with Noah Coleman scoring twice for South Lismore and winning the Terry Greedy medal for the player of the match. The grand final marked the end of an era with Damon Bell, the Byron Bay coach announcing his retirement during grand final week. During Bell's highly-successful 7-year reign Byron Bay won:

 4 Premier League premierships
 3 Cyril Mayo Cups (for winning the grand final)
 1 ANZAC Cup
 the treble (ANZAC Cup, premiership and Cyril Mayo Cup (grand final)) in 2018

In August FFNC flagged changes to the structure of senior competitions in 2020 aimed at re-invigorating and removing constraints at the top levels:

 Men's Premier Division to be re-branded as Men's Premier League
 Women's Premier Division to be re-branded as Women's Premier League
 Men's Premier Reserves to be re-branded as the Championship League

The 2020 Men's Premier League will have 9 teams including the yet to be confirmed return of Maclean.

2019 - Premier Division Final Table & Cyril Mayo Cup

Trophies

ANZAC Cup (from 1950-1971), ANZAC Shield (from 1972)
The first ANZAC Cup was played on Tuesday night 25 April 1950 as part of the ANZAC Day Sports Carnival. This carnival featured athletics, cycling, woodchopping, national dancing, rugby league and soccer. The ANZAC Cup was donated in 1949 by the Lismore RSL.

The inaugural ANZAC Cup kicked off at 8-30pm between Methodist United and North Lismore Marauders. In an "evenly contested" game played under "inadequate lighting" Methodist United won 1 - 0 thanks to a goal by M Bell. The teams and officials for the inaugural ANZAC Cup were:

 Methodist United - M Santin (Goalkeeper), R Hill, K Stevenson, L Morley (?), Stan Pendrigh, George Chalmers (Captain-Coach), Fryer, M Bell, H Forster, Jack Dalmeyer, G Barnes
 North Lismore Marauders - E Morgan (Goalkeeper), G Rogers (Captain), L Bryant, J Brady, Ossie Pomroy, H McDonald, J Docherty, Bill Driver, Bill Woolnough, R Bowen & K Matteson. Reserves - A Wakley, A Parker, G Kennedy, A Woolnough, A Manitta
 Referee - Clarrie Richards
 Linesmen - Jim Gooch, Charlie Thompson

In the early years the Cup was played between the Cup holders and a challenger decided by ballot. The Cup holders only had to draw to retain the Cup. For example, in 1951 the Cup holders Methodist United drew 3–3 all with the challengers Eastwood United, and retained the Cup. The date of the Cup also varied in the early years due to "inadequate lighting facilities" although it's now played on ANZAC Day or the weekend before or after ANZAC Day and usually at Oakes Oval, Lismore.

The record for the most ANZAC Cup wins is held by Lismore Workers with 19 (including 9 as Eastwood United). However, the record for the most consecutive wins is held by Italo Stars which won the renamed ANZAC Shield for 9 consecutive years from 1973 to 1981 including 6 wins over the luckless Eastwood United:

 1973 at Oakes Oval - Italo Stars 3 (Andy Stevens, Gordon Bryant, Kevin Watts) - Eastwood United 0
 1974 at Nielson Park - Italo Stars 1 (Mick Stevens) - Lismore Thistles 0
 1975 at Oakes Oval - Italo Stars 0 - Eastwood United 0 (Italo Stars retained the Shield as holders)
 1976 at Oakes Oval - Italo Stars 4 (scorers unknown) - Eastwood United 0
 1977 at Nielson Park - Italo Stars 3 (Gary Northcote, Greg Sharpe (2)) - Eastwood United 1 (Gerrard Pollard)
 1978 at Oakes Oval - Italo Stars 1 (Peter Jenson) - Goonellabah 0
 1979 at Oakes Oval - Italo Stars 3 (Rod Dargie, John Essex (2)) - Goonellabah 3 (Ian McDonald, Rodney Eather, Steven Hapgood) (Italo Stars retained the Shield as holders)
 1980 at Oakes Oval - Italo Stars 2 - Eastwood United 2 (Italo Stars retained the Shield as holders)
 1981 at Oakes Oval - Italo Stars 3 - Eastwood United 1

Special mention to the powerful Goonellabah Stars side of the 1950s which won their first ANZAC Cup in 1952 and then won it for the next 5 years:

 1952 at Recreation Ground Number 3 - Goonellabah Stars 4 (K Packham (2), R McDermott (2)) - Methodist United 2 (R Hill, J Parker)
 1953 at Oakes Oval - Goonellabah Stars 4 (R McDermott, B McPherson (2), J Teale) - Church of Christ Crusaders 0
 1954 at Nielson Park - Goonellabah Stars 7 (N Manitta (3), J Wraight (2), R Minarelli, K McDermott) - Methodist United 1 (M Marsh)
 1955 at Oakes Oval - Goonellabah Stars 5 (Nino Manitta, Ben Neilson (2), Ken Eastment (2)) - Church of Christ Crusaders 2 (Ross Reid, Warren Taber)
 1956 at Oakes Oval - Goonellabah Stars 3 (Ben Nielson (2 including a penalty), Pomfret) - Eastwood United 1 (Hodgkinson)
 1957 at Recreation Ground Number 10 - Goonellabah Stars defeated Internationals (No details available)

Cyril Mayo Cup (from 1958)
Cyril Mayo emigrated from England as a 17-year old in the early 1900s and settled in the North Rivers region. Cyril was a competent player for North Lismore and after his playing days took up refereeing.

Tragically Cyril was killed in a car crash in 1957. Cyril's wife Lucy commissioned a trophy to remember Cyril's contribution to the game, the Cyril Mayo Cup which has "become the most sought after piece of silverware in local soccer". The cup is awarded to the highest Men's Division grand final winner's also known as Champions. It was first awarded in 1958 to Goonellabah Stars following their 1 - 0 win over Eastwood United at Oakes Oval, Lismore. Ben Nielson was Goonellabah Star's goalscorer.

The cup was originally called the Cyril Mayo Memorial Challenge Cup but in more recent times has been referred to simply and affectionately as "Cyril".

Most Consecutive Cyril Mayo Cup Wins

The record for the most number of consecutive Cyril Mayo Cup wins is 5 and is jointly held by:

 Lismore Thistles - 1970, 1971, 1972, 1973, 1974
 Italo Stars - 1977, 1978, 1979, 1980, 1981

Callan McMillan Memorial Shield (from 1978)
In 1972 a young Scotsman Callan McMillan Junior left the country of his birth headed for Australia where he eventually settled in Lismore. An avid Glasgow Rangers supporter, Callan was soon involved in local football as a coach and member of the inaugural Far North Coast Amateur Soccer Association Committee in 1977.

Tragedy struck in December 1977 when Callan Junior drowned whilst trying to save a young girl. The local football community rallied to support Callan's family, and in 1978 the Callan McMillan Memorial Shield was struck to commemorate his contribution to the local game. The shield was presented to the winner of the women's knock-out competition.

In 1996 when the North Coast Women's Soccer Association and the Lismore District Soccer Association amalgamated, it was agreed that the shield be incorporated with the men's ANZAC Cup/Shield knockout competition held on ANZAC day.

FFNC Clubs

The following clubs are affiliated with Football Far North Coast:

Former FFNC Clubs

The following teams were once part of competitions organised by Football Far North Coast and its predecessors:

Kingscliff (moved to the Gold Coast Football League)
Maclean Bobcats (moved to the Mid North Coast Football League) 
Murwillumbah Saints (moved to the Gold Coast Football League)
Tweed Heads
Goonellabah Stars - in existence from 1949 to 1965. A separate club to Italian-Australian Stars (now Italo Stars) which was formed in 1966.
 Goolmangar
 Dungarubba
 Woodlawn College
 Coraki
 Evans Head
 Bonalbo
 Southern Cross University
 Methodist United OK (Order of the Knights)
 North Lismore Marauders
 Tyalgum Taipans

Honours - Women

Honours - Men

Honours - Men (Summary)

The Treble
Women

The treble (Callan McMillan Shield, Premiership and grand final in the same season) has been achieved by 5 clubs on at least 10 occasions (unsure of the complete list due to incomplete records):

Men

The treble (ANZAC Cup, Premiership and grand final in the same season) has been achieved by 5 clubs on 8 occasions. In 2017, Byron Bay became the first club to win four trophies: the traditional treble plus the Summer Youth League.

Awards

2019 Awards 
Player of the Year
 Women (Premier Division) - Elsa Mangan (Lismore Thistles)
 Men (Premier Division) - Patrick Kable (South Lismore)

Golden Boot
 Women (Premier Division) - Olivia Collins (Lismore Thistles) - 17 goals
 Women (Open) - Catherine North (Uki) - 31 goals
 Men (Premier Division) - Lisandro Luaces (Byron Bay) - 24 goals
 Men (Open) - Glen Godbee (Shores United) - 33 goals

Women's Premier Team of the Year
 1 Arky Ryall (Lismore Thistles)
 2 Violet Innes (Byron Bay)
 3 Brittney Webster (Alstonville)
 4 Natalia Brooker (Lismore Thistles)
 5 Maddie Green (Byron Bay)
 6 Chelsea Coleman (Lennox Head)
 7 Elsa Mangan (Lismore Thistles)
 8 Laura Marlowe (Italo Stars)
 9 Jessie Jordan (Alstonville)
 10 Lisa Bolt (Alstonville)
 11 Olivia Collins (Lismore Thistles)
 Coach - Thaya Evenden (Lennox Head)

Men's Premier Team of the Year
 1 Pierce Essery (Byron Bay)
 2 Jeremy Perkins (Richmond Rovers)
 3 James Tomlinson (Byron Bay)
 4 Shayne Smith (Richmond Rovers)
 5 Bobby Bugden (Richmond Rovers)
 6 Joel Rudgley (Bangalow)
 7 Oscar Stahl (Lismore Thistles)
 8 Patrick Kable (South Lismore)
 9 Diego Vazquez (Byron Bay)
 10 Jye Wilson (Lismore Thistles)
 11 Lisandro Luaces (Byron Bay)
 Coach - Damon Bell (Byron Bay)

Referee of the Year
 Connor Johnston

Birmingham Dedication to Football Award
 Wally Edwards (Richmond Rovers)

Club Championship
 Byron Bay (3rd)

2018 Awards
Player of the Year
Women (Premier Division) - Keea Parrish (Lismore Thistles)
Men (Premier Division) - Jonathon See (Richmond Rovers)

Golden Boot
 Women (Premier Division) - Stephanie Foreman (Mullumbimby Brunswick Valley)
 Women (Open) - Joyce De Wit (Ballina)
 Men (Premier Division) - Jonathon See (Richmond Rovers)
 Men (Open) - Harrison Langford (Lennox Head)

Team of the Year - Women's Premier
 Goalkeeper - Karoline Verrall (Lennox Head)
 Defenders - Thaya Evenden (Lennox Head), Breanna Gatt (Lismore Thistles), Brooke Sheehan (Lennox Head), Brittany Webster (Alstonville)
 Midfielders - Lisa Bolt (Byron Bay), Zoe Corbett (Byron Bay), Elsa Mangan (Lismore Thistles), Caitlin Moss (Lismore Thistles)
 Strikers - Stephanie Foreman (Mullumbimby Brunswick Valley), Keea Parrish (Lismore Thistles)
 Coach - Paul Albertini (Lismore Thistles)

Team of the Year - Men's Premier
 Goalkeeper - Chris Jones (Richmond Rovers)
 Defenders - Patrick Kable (South Lismore), Shayne Smith (Richmond Rovers), James Tomlinson (Byron Bay), Gabe Vidler (Alstonville)
 Midfielders - Bob Mullenburg (South Lismore), Tom Pitman (Goonellabah), Oscar Stahl (Lismore Thistles), Kurt Walker (Richmond Rovers)
 Strikers - Jonathan Pierce (Byron Bay), Jonathon See (Richmond Rovers)
 Coach - Cameron Hyde (South Lismore)

Referee of the Year
 Anthony Smith (4th)

Birmingham Dedication to Football
 Brian Breckenridge (Tumbulgum)

Club Championship
 Alstonville

2017 Awards
Player of the Year
Women (Premier Division) - Hollie Jarrett (Bangalow)
Men (Premier Division) - Kaiden Powell (Goonellabah)

Golden Boot
 Women (Premier Division) - Hollie Jarrett (Bangalow) - 19 goals
 Men (Premier Division) - Joel Wood (Byron Bay)

Team of the Year

Women
 Goalkeeper - Karoline Verrall (Lennox Head)
 Defenders - Erin Huntsman (Alstonville), Claudia Hewitt (Lismore Thistles), Miranda Sochacki (Bangalow), Thaya Evenden (Lennox Head)
 Midfielders - Elsa Mangan (Lismore Thistles), Caitlan Moss (Lismore Thistles), Jess Woolfe (Alstonville), Jenna Lees (Lismore Thistles)
 Strikers - Keea Parrish (Lismore Thistles), Hollie Jarrett (Bangalow)
 Coach - Mick Smith (Lennox Head)
Men
 Goalkeeper - Chris Jones (Richmond Rovers)
 Defenders - James Tomlinson (Byron Bay), Shayne Smith (Richmond Rovers), Daniel Flynn (Richmond Rovers), Jay Keevers (Lismore Workers)
 Midfielders - Russell Dent (Richmond Rovers), Kaiden Powell (Goonellabah), Sam Shepherd (Byron Bay), Ben Ahern (Byron Bay)
 Strikers - Aaron Walker (Byron Bay), Dean Casey (Casino)
 Coach - Damon Bell (Byron Bay)
Referee of the Year
 Anthony Smith (3rd)
Birmingham Dedication to Football Award
 Jason Toniello (Lismore Workers)
Club Championship
 Mullumbimby Brunswick Valley

2016 Awards
Player of the Year
 Women - Hollie Jarrett (Bangalow)
 Men - Joel Rudgley (Bangalow)
Golden Boot Awards
 Women (Premier Division) - Hollie Jarrett (Bangalow) - 21 goals
 Women (Open) - Tara Bayles (Italo Stars) - 33 goals
 Men (Premier Division) - Aaron Walker (Byron Bay) - 23 goals
 Men (Open) - Adam Church (Mullumbimby Brunswick Valley) - 30 goals
FFNC Premiership Team of the Year

Women
 Goalkeeper - Karoline Verral (Lennox Head)
 Defenders - Karina Young (Lismore Thistles), Isabelle Braly (Bangalow), Brooke Sheehan (Alstonville), Claudia Hewitt (Lismore Thistles)
 Midfielders - Elsa Mangan (Lismore Thistles), Laani Winkler-Harding (Bangalow), Emily McCann (Alstonville)
 Strikers - Hollie Jarrett (Bangalow), Jade Bianchetti (Bangalow), Chelsea Coleman (Lennox Head)
 Coach - Mick Smith (Lennox Head)
Men
 Joel Rudgley, Josh Cole, Sam Ireland (Bangalow)
 James Tomlinson (Byron Bay)
 Brad Robertson, Matt Graham, Kurt Stephens (Goonellabah)
 Jay Keevers (Lismore Workers)
 Shane Smith, Russell Dent, Jonathon See (Richmond Rovers)

Referee of the Year (The Glen Gibbs Trophy)
 Anthony Smith (2nd)

Birmingham Dedication to Football Award
 The Hanigan Family (Bangalow)

Club Championship
 Richmond Rovers (12th)

2015 Awards
Player of the Year (Premier Division)
 Women - Jade Bianchetti (Bangalow)
 Men - Byron Milne (Lennox Head)
Golden Boot
 Women (Premier Division) - Jade Bianchetti (Bangalow) - 40 goals
 Men (Premier Division) - Byron Milne (Lennox Head)
Teams of the Year (Premier Division)

Women
 Goalkeeper - Simone Stroet (Bangalow)
 Defenders - Bree Minikin (Lennox Head), Isabele Braly (Bangalow), Brooke Sheehan (Alstonville), Jess Woolf (Alstonville)
 Midfielders - Hollie Jarrett (Bangalow), Elsa Mangan (Lismore Workers), Chelsea Coleman (Lennox Head)
 Strikers - Keea Parrish (Lismore Workers), Emily McCann (Alstonville), Jade Bianchetti (Bangalow)
 Coach - Mick Smith (Lennox Head)

Men

Referee of the Year
 Anthony Smith (1st)

Birmingham Dedication to Football Award
 Matthew Wiltshire (Alstonville)

Club Championship
 Byron Bay

2014 Awards
Player of the Year (Premier Division)
 Women - Jade Bianchetti (Bangalow)
 Men - Jonathon See (Richmond Rovers)

Golden Boot Awards
 Women (Premier Division) - Jade Bianchetti (Bangalow) - 40 goals
 Women (Open) - Stephanie Foreman (Mullumbimby Brunswick Valley) - 54 goals
 Men (Premier Division) - Jonathon See (Richmond Rovers) - 28 goals
 Men (Open) - Sam Tomlinson (Shores United) & Eduardo Divanna (Eureka) - 28 goals

Teams of the Year

Women
 Goalkeeper - Georgia Spencer (Alstonville)
 Defenders - Tanika Hand (Bangalow), Karina Young (Lismore Thisltes), Sarah Duley (Lennox Head), Laura St Ruth (Lismore Workers)
 Midfielders - Jessica Woolfe (Alstonville), Elsa Mangan (Lismore Workers), Rose Argent (Bangalow)
 Strikers -  Jade Bianchetti (Bangalow), Serena Mangan (Lismore Workers), Hollie Jarrett (Bangalow)
 Coach - Luke McWaide (Lismore Workers)

Men
 Goalkeeper - Brad Robertson (Lismore Thistles)
 Defenders - Eamon Banks (Alstonville), Jay Keevers (Lismore Workers), Max Hospers (Lismore Thistles), Shaun Packham (Byron Bay)
 Midfielders - Kurt Walker (Lismore Workers), Russell Dent (Richmond Rovers), Connor Cannon (Byron Bay)
 Strikers - Jonathon See (Richmond Rovers), Kazi Tsukamoto (Byron Bay), Liam Giles (Alstonville)
 Coach - Brian Bugden (Richmond Rovers)

Referee of the Year
 Stuart Bradley
Birmingham Dedication to Soccer Award
 Glenn Rose (Kyogle)
Club Championship
 Richmond Rovers (11th)

2013 Awards
Player of the Year
 Women - Jade Bianchetti (Bangalow)
 Men - Dean Casey (Casino)

Golden Boot Awards
 Women (Premier League) - Jade Bianchetti (Bangalow) - 28 goals
 Women (Open) - Tiaharna Close (Casino) - 34 goals
 Men (Premier League) - Sebastian Bell (Byron Bay) - 28 goals
 Men (Open) - Gou Brummel Huis (Bangalow) - 34 goals

Teams of the Year

Women
 Goalkeeper - Karoline Verrall (Richmond Rovers)
 Brooke Sheehan (Alstonville), Hannah Sheehan (Alstonville), Sarah Flower (Richmond Rovers), Georgia Keen (Alstonville), Jenna Lees (Lismore Thistles), Isabelle Pratt (Lismore Workers), Chelsea Coleman (Alstonville), Jade Bianchetti (Bangalow), Abbie Heffernan (Richmond Rovers), Hollie Jarrett (Bangalow)
 Coach - Paul Hanigan (Bangalow)

Men
 Goalkeeper - Brad Robertson (Lismore Thistles)
 Eamon Banks (Alstonville), Max Toovey (Lismore Thistles), Max Hospers (Lismore Thistles), Shaun Packham (Byron Bay), Kurt Walker (Lismore Workers), Darren Beardow (Lismore Thistles), Joel Rudgley (Bangalow), Jonathon See (Richmond Rovers), Dean Casey (Casino), Sebastian Bell (Byron Bay)
 Coach - Paul Parmenter (Lismore Thistles)

Referee of the Year
 Jared Seiffert

Birmingham Dedication to Soccer
 Rob Sheehan (Alstonville)

Club Championship
 Lismore Thistles

2012 Awards

Player of the Year
 Women - Hollie Jarrett (Bangalow)
 Men - Martin Kelleher (Lismore Workers)

Golden Boot Awards
 Women (Premier Division) - Jade Bianchetti (Bangalow) - 23 goals
 Women (Open) - Tiaharna Close (Casino) - 37 goals
 Men (Premier Division) - Martin Kelleher (Lismore Workers) - 18 goals
 Men (Open) - Phil Courtney (Nimbin Headers) - 39 goals

Team of the Year

Women
 Goalkeeper - Sophie Thomson (Ballina)
 Jade Bianchetti (Bangalow), Kendall Brazendale (Lennox Head), Chelsea Coleman (Alstonville), Ellie Fryer (Alstonville), Abbie Heffernan (Richmond Rovers), Hollie Jarrett (Bangalow), Georgia Keen (Alstonville), Brooke Sheehan (Alstonville), Laani Winkler-Harding (Lismore Thistles), Kim Wraight (Lismore Thistles)
 Coach - David Weaver (Ballina)

Men

 Goalkeeper - Bryce Walley (Casino)
 Eamon Banks (Alstonville), Richard Hanna (Alstonville), Max Hospers (Lismore Thistles), Martin Kelleher (Lismore Workers), Luke McWaide (Richmond Rovers), Wayne Mortimer (Lismore Workers), Baithok Ring (Goonellabah), Sam Robson (Byron Bay), Joel Saye (Richmond Rovers), Kurt Walker (Lismore Workers)
 Coach - Troy Taylor (Alstonville)

Referee of the Year
 Stuart Bradley

Birmingham Dedication to Soccer

 Paul Albertini (Lismore Thistles)

Club Championship
 Goonellabah

2011 Awards
Player of the Year (Premier Division)
Women - Abbie Heffernan (Richmond Rovers) & Teneille Shaw (Bangalow)
Men - Matt Olley (Richmond Rovers)

Golden Boot Award (Premier Division)
Women - Chelsea Coleman (Alstonville) & Hollie Jarrett (Bangalow) - 25 goals
Men - Matt Olley (Richmond Rovers)

Team of the Year (Premier Division)

Women
Goalkeeper - Sophie Thompson (Byron Bay)
Defenders - Tenielle Shaw (Bangalow), Ellie Fryer (Alstonville), Maria Wilson (Lismore Workers) 
Midfielders - Sarah Flower (Richmond Rovers), Brooke Sheehan (Alstonville), Elsa Mangan (Alstonville), Deanna Thomson (Bangalow)
Strikers - Hollie Jarrett (Bangalow), Abbie Heffernan (Richmond Rovers), Chelsea Coleman (Alstonville), Tegan Blanch (Richmond Rovers)
Coach - Rob Sheehan (Alstonville)

Men
Goalkeeper - Lucas Wagland (Ballina)
Defenders - Max Hospers (Lismore Thistles), Mitchell Flower (Richmond Rovers), Joel Saye (Richmond Rovers)
Midfielders - Dave Lonie (Pottsville), Kurt Walker (Lismore Workers), Ian Mcgregor (Richmond Rovers), Matt Dorigo (Goonellabah)
Strikers - Kazuhiro Tsukamoto (Byron Bay), Wayne Mortimer (Casino), Matt Olley (Richmond Rovers)
Coach - Scott Collis (Lismore Workers)

Referee of the Year
Luke Mackney (3rd)

Club Championship
 Bangalow

2010 Awards
Player of the Year
 Women (1st Division) - Sarah Flower (Richmond Rovers)
 Men (Premier Division) - Dave Annetts (Goonellabah)

Golden Boot
 Women (1st Division) - Chelsea Coleman (Alstonville) - 28 goals
 Women (Open) - Tiaharna Close (Casino) - 43 goals
 Men (Premier Division) - Dave Annetts (Goonellabah) - 23 goals
 Men (Open) - Steven Clifford (Ballina) - 25 goals

Teams of the Year

Women
 1. Tegan Blanch (Richmond Rovers), 2. Christy Hopley (Bangalow), 3. Renee Cowan (Lismore Workers), 4. Laura St Ruth (Lismore Workers), 5. Josie Bancroft (Lismore Workers), 6. Ellie Fryer (Alstonville), 7. Ruby Edwards (Alstonville), 8. Sarah Flower (Richmond Rovers), 9. Chloe Dunsmore (Bangalow), 10. Chelsea Coleman (Alstonville), 11. Hollie Jarrett (Bangalow)
 Coach of the Year - Corey Loft (Lismore Workers)

Men
 1. Brad Robertson (Goonellabah), 2. Mitchell Flower (Richmond Rovers), 3. Dane Seymour (Ballina), 4. Dylan Rippon (Goonellabah), 5. Paul Pomroy (Goonellabah), 6. Anthony Alvos (Lismore Workers), 7. Daniel Baxter-Wright (Alstonville), 8. Aaron Heffernan (Richmond Rovers), 9. Jonathon See (Richmond Rovers), 10. Dave Annetts (Goonellabah), 11. Dave Lonie (Pottsville)
 Coach of the Year - Dave Lonie (Pottsville)

Referee of the Year
 Adam Coupe

Birmingham Dedication to Football
 Steve Towner (South Lismore)

Club Championship
 Richmond Rovers (10th)

2009 Awardshttps://www.echonews.com.au/news/kicking-goals-for-football-far-north-coast/354335/ 
Player of the Year
 Women (1st Division) - Martene Wallace (Italo Stars)
 Men (Premier Division) - Darren Beardow (4th) (Lismore Thistles) & Anthony Alvos (3rd) (Lismore Workers)

Golden Boot
 Women (1st Division) - Hollie Jarrett (Bangalow) & Martene Wallace (Italo Stars) - 23 goals
 Women (Open) - Alexandra Kennedy (Ballina) - 21 goals
 Men (Premier Division) - Max Latimer (Italo Stars) & Jordy Campbell (Byron Bay) - 16 goals
 Men (Open) - Dean Treveton (Brunswick Valley) - 24 goals

Teams of the Year

Women
 Tegan Blanch (Richmond Rovers), Whitney McNall (Richmond Rovers), Jessica Grissell (Woodburn), Tennielle Shaw (Bangalow), Sarah Flower (Richmond Rovers), Martene Wallace (Italo Stars), Renae Cowan (Lismore Workers), Brooke Sheehan (Alstonville), Hollie Jarrett (Bangalow), Rose Argent (Bangalow), Teonie Rushton (Richmond Rovers)
 Coach of the Year - Joel Rudgley (Bangalow)

Men
 Goalkeeper - Andrew Marshall (Richmond Rovers)
 Joel Saye (Richmond Rovers), Dane Seymour (Ballina), Daniel Morrow (Goonellabah), Clint Willoughby (Italo Stars), Russell Dent (Richmond Rovers), Anthony Alvos (Lismore Workers), Darren Beardow (Lismore Thistles), Ben Casagrande (Richmond Rovers), Mark Rosenstein (Goonellabah), Max Latimer (Italo Stars), Jordy Campbell (Byron Bay)
 Coach of the Year - Paul Ianna (Lismore Workers)

Referee of the Year
 Luke Mackney (2nd)

Birmingham Dedication to Soccer Award
 Brenda Zakaras (Lennox Head) & Frank Scott (Alstonville)

Club Championship
 Richmond Rovers (9th)

2008 Awards
Player of the Year
 Women (1st Division) - Shelley West-Watts (Lismore Thistles)
 Men (Premier Division) - Ben Andrews (Lennox Head) & Anthony Alvos (Lismore Workers)

Golden Boot
 Women (1st Division) - Chelsea Coleman (Lennox Head)
 Women (Open) - Naomi Dean (Bangalow)
 Men (Premier Division) - Troy Matthews (Richmond Rovers)
 Men (Open) - Michael Ravenscroft (Goonellabah)

Teams of the Year

Women
 Whitney McNall, Angela Penfound (Richmond Rovers), Thaya Evenden, Sophie Towner, Amanda Brett, Abigail Allardyce (Lennox Head),  Brooke Sheehan,  Courtney Nelson (Alstonville), Jane DeConti, Teonie Rushton (Italo Stars), Shelley West-Watts (Lismore Thistles)
 Women's Coach of the Year - John De Conti (Italo Stars)

Men
 Nathan Wilson (Pottsville), Dane Seymour, Dave Betterridge, Shannon Maciejewski (Ballina), Joel Saye, Mitchell Flower (Richmond Rovers), Anthony Alvos (Lismore Workers), Bill Latimer (Italo Stars), Mark Rosenstein (Goonellabah), Ben Andrews (Lennox Head), Tom Boland (Lismore Thistles)
 Men's Coach of the Year - Ken MacPherson (Lismore Thistles)

Referee of the Year
 Tanya De Boer

Birmingham Dedication to Soccer
 Carlo Borra (Richmond Rovers) & the Lee family (Pottsville)

Club Championship
 Richmond Rovers

2007 Awards
Player of the Year
 Women - Gypsy Hechtl (Lismore Workers)
 Men - Troy Matthews (Richmond Rovers)
Golden Boot Awards
 Women - Abigail Allardyce (Lennox Head) - 36 goals
 Men - Paul Kirkland (Lennox Head) & Jordy Campbell (Byron Bay) - 18 goals
Team of the Year (Premier Division)

Women
 Goalkeeper - Jessica Rasso (Burringbar)
 Defenders - Sharde Pohatu (Burringbar), Laura Cahill (Burringbar), Fallon Campbell (Richmond Rovers), Thaya Evenden (Lennox Head)
 Midfielders - Gypsy Hechtl (Lismore Workers), Amanda Brett (Lennox Head), Sophie Towner (Lennox Head), Martene Wallace (Lennox Head)
 Strikers - Samantha Walsh (Tumbulgum), Abigail Allardyce (Lennox Head)
 Coach - Damion Davis (Lennox Head)

Men
 Goalkeeper - Alex Pratt (Bangalow)
 Defenders - Joel Saye (Richmond Rovers), Scott Coster (Richmond Rovers), Shaun Packham (Byron Bay), Mike Raeburn (Lennox Head)
 Midfielders - Anthony Alvos (Lismore Workers), Joel Rudgley (Bangalow), Jonathan Pierce (Byron Bay), Ben Casagrande (Richmond Rovers)
 Strikers - Troy Matthews (Richmond Rovers), Paul Kirkland (Lennox Head)
 Coach - Brendan Logan (Goonellabah) & Damon Bell (Bangalow)

Referee of the Year
 Luke Mackney (1st)

Club Championship

2006 Awards
Player of the Year
 Women - Martene Edwards (Richmond Rovers)
 Men - Ben Andrews (Goonellabah)

Golden Boot
 Women (1st Division) - Martene Edwards (Richmond Rovers)
 Men (Premier Division) - Paul Kirkland (Lennox Head) & Tom Guttormsen (Lismore Workers)

Premier Division Team of the Year (Women)
 Goalkeeper - Jaqueline Leuthi (Goonellabah)
 Defenders - Tanika Hand (Byron Bay), Renee Cowan (Lismore Workers), Thaya Evenden (Goonellabah), Whitney McNall (Richmond Rovers)
 Midfielders - Kim Wraight (Lismore Workers), Felicity Kerslake (Goonellabah), Martene Edwards (Richmond Rovers)
 Strikers - Hayley McAnelly (Richmond Rovers), Jenna Gollan (Lismore Workers), Rose Argent (Byron Bay)

Premier Division Team of the Year (Men)
 Goalkeeper - Kai Connell (Byron Bay)
 Defenders - Aaron Richter-Steers (Byron Bay), Mike Raeburn (Lennox Head), Russell Dent (Richmond Rovers), AAron Heffernan (Richmond Rovers)
 Midfielders - Anthony Alvos (Richmond Rovers), Shaun Packham (Byron Bay), Erris Dufficy (Maclean)
 Strikers - Ben Andrews (Goonellabah), Tom Guttormsen (Lismore Workers), Paul Kirkland (Lennox Head)
 Premier Division Coach of the Year - Peter Ware (Byron Bay) & Steve O'Sullivan (Maclean)

Referee of the Year
 Leigh McMaster

Club Championship
 Richmond Rovers

2005 Awards
Player of the Year
 Women (1st Division) - Renee McIntosh (Richmond Rovers)
 Men (Premier Division) - Aaron Richter-Steers (Byron Bay)

Golden Boot
 Women (1st Division) - Renee McIntosh (Richmond Rovers) - 28 goals
 Women (Open) - Tracy Want (Lismore Thistles) & Courtney Nelson (Alstonville)
 Men (Premier Division) - Peter O'Neill (Goonellabah) - 23 goals
 Men (Open) - Matthew Flaherty (Woodburn)

Premier Division Team of the Year
 Goalkeeper - Brett Chaplin (Goonellabah)
 Defenders - Aaron Richter-Steers (Byron Bay), Russell Dent (Richmond Rovers), Damien Keevers (Lismore Workers), Stewart Coughran (Casino)
 Midfielders - Anthony Alvos (Lismore Workers), Darren Beardow (Lismore Thistles), Kevin Crofton (Maclean)
 Strikers - Peter O'Neill (Goonellabah), Ben Andrews (Goonellabah), Wayne Mortimer (Italo Stars)
 Coach - Peter Ware (Byron Bay)

Referee of the Year
 Glenn Gibbs (3rd)

Birmingham Dedication to Soccer Award
 Nick Rudgley (Bangalow)

Club Championship
 Alstonville

2004 Awards

Player of the Year
 Women - Felicity Kerslake (Southern Cross University)
 Men - Anthony Alvos (Lismore Workers)

Golden Boot Awards
 Women - Rose Argent (Byron Bay)
 Men - Tom Guttormsen (Lismore Workers)

Team of the Year

Men (Premier Division)

 Goalkeeper - Lucas Wagland (Ballina)
 Defenders - Shaun Packham (Byron Bay), Anthony Nind (Lismore Thistles), Tim Sheridan (Richmond Rovers)
 Midfielders - Christian Watson (Ballina), Anthony Alvos (Lismore Workers), Damien Keevers (Lismore Workers), Kevin Crofton (Maclean)
 Strikers - Tom Guttormsen (Lismore Workers), Wayne Mortimer (Casino), Adam Bostock (Byron Bay)
 Coach - Peter Rologas (Bangalow)

Referee of the Year
 Glen Gibbs (2nd)

Club Championship

 Richmond Rovers

2003 Awards
Player of the Year
 Women - Katie Parker (Richmond Rovers)
 Men - Jim Harris (Maclean)

Golden Boot
 Women - Katie Parker (Richmond Rovers)
 Men - Wayne Mortimer (Italo Stars) & Troy Matthews (Richmond Rovers)

Premier Division Team of the Year (Men)
 Goalkeeper - Brett Chaplin (Lismore Thistles)
 Defenders - Anthony Nind (Lismore Thistles), Ben Haigh (Alstonville), Rowan Walker (Alstonville)
 Midfielders - Jim Harris (Maclean), Anthony Alvos (Lismore Workers), Brett Lane (Richmond Rovers), Clint Willoughby (Italo Stars), Kevin Crofton (Maclean)
 Strikers - Wayne Mortimer (Italo Stars), Jed Wright (Byron Bay)
 Premier Division Coach of the Year - Stuart Harris (Italo Stars) & Dennis Dalcin (Casino Cobras)

Referee of the Year
 Clive Owen

Club Championship
 Lennox Head

2002 Awards
Player of the Year
 Women - Martene Edwards (Richmond Rovers)
 Men - David Betteridge (Ballina)

Golden Boot
 Women - Martene Edwards (Richmond Rovers)
 Men - Wayne Mortimer (Italo Stars)

Premier Division Team of the Year (Men)
 Goalkeeper - Lucas Wagland (Ballina)
 Defenders - David Betteridge (Ballina), Luke McAnelly (Richmond Rovers), 
 Midfielders - Kevin Crofton (Maclean), Anthony Alvos (Lismore Workers), 
 Strikers - Wayne Mortimer (Italo Stars),
 Reserves - Darren Beardow (Lismore Thistles), Brett Chaplin (Lismore Thistles), Tim Casagrande (Italo Stars), Craig Wiblen (Italo Stars)
 Coaches - Graham Bird (Byron Bay) & John Percival (Ballina)

Referee of the Year
 Stuart Bradley

Club Championship
 Byron Bay

2001 Awards

Player of the Year (Premier League)
 Women - Natalie Anderson (Maclean)

Golden Boot (Premier League)
 Men - Daniel Fung (Maclean) - 24 goals

Club Championship
 Italo-Stars (1st)

2000 Awards
Player of the Year (Premier League)
 Women - Hayley McAnelly (Richmond Rovers)
 Men - Daniel Fung (Maclean)

Golden Boot (Premier League)
 Women - Martene Edwards (Richmond Rovers)
 Men - Daniel Fung (Maclean) - 16 goals

Premier Division Team of the Year (Men)
 Goalkeeper - Scott Collis (Lismore Workers)
 Defenders - Todd Gava (Italo Stars), Aaron Nugent (Italo Stars), Luke McAnelly (Richmond Rovers), Stewart Coughran (Southern Cross University)
 Midfielders -  Anthony Alvos (Lismore Workers), Darren Beardow (Lismore Thistles), Craig Metcalfe (Italo Stars), Todd Patch (Southern Cross University)
 Strikers - Wayne Mortimer (Casino), Daniel Fung (Maclean), Tim Sheridan (Richmond Rovers)
 Coach - Stuart Harris (Italo Stars)

Referee of the Year
 Lee MacMaster

Club Championship
 Richmond Rovers

1999 Awards
Player of the Year
 Female - Ashley Wilson (Goonellabah)
 Male - Troy Percival (Ballina)

Golden Boot Awards
 Female - Martene Edwards (Richmond Rovers) - 
 Male - Tim Sheridan (Richmond Rovers) - 17 goals

Premier Division Team of the Year (Men)
 Goalkeeper - Lucas Wagland (Ballina)
 Defenders - Luke McAnelly (Richmond Rovers), Todd Gava (Italo Stars), Aaron Bylos (Maclean), Jason Collins (Southern Cross University)
 Midfielders - Darren Beardow (Lismore Thistles), Troy Percival (Ballina), Craig Metcalf (Italo Stars), Kevin Crofton (Maclean)
 Strikers - Neal Harding (Lismore Thistles), Grant Neilson (Maclean)
 Coach - Grant Nielson (Maclean)

Referee of the Year
 Mark Predebon

Dedication to Soccer Award
 Wal Trainor (Tintenbar)

1998 Awards
Player of the Year
 Female - Natalie Anderson (Maclean)
 Male - Darren Beardow (3rd) (Lismore Thistles)

Golden Boot
 Female (1st Division) - Tracy Want (Maclean)
 Female (Open) - Jenny Bouke (Italo Stars)
 Male (Premier Division) - Nathan Scully (Casino) & Matthew Lampard (Goonellabah)
Male (Open) - Phillip Alley (Alstonville)

Premier Division Team of the Year (Men)
 Goalkeeper - Adam Fittock (Goonellabah)
 Defenders - Todd Gava (Italo Stars), Jason Toniello (Lismore Workers), Paul Wiltshire (Lismore Workers)
 Midfielders - Darren Beardow (Lismore Thistles), Anthony Alvos (Lismore Workers), Damien Keevers (Goonellabah), Greg Huxtable (Goonellabah), Dean Klower (Ballina)
 Strikers - Matthew Lampard (Goonellabah), Brad Bosworth (Lismore Workers)
 Coach - John Essex (Italo Stars)

Referee of the Year
 Dick Nolan

Club Championship
 Richmond Rovers

1997 Awards
Player of the Year (Premier League)
 Female - Martene Edwards (Richmond Rovers)
 Male - Darren Beardow (2nd) (Lismore Thistles)

Golden Boot
 Premier League (Female) - Cass Thorman (Richmond Rovers) - 23 goals
 Premier League (Male) - Darren Beardow (Lismore Thistles) & Paul Schaefer (Italo Stars) - 16 goals
 Open (Female) - ?
 Open (Male) - ?

Premier Division Team of the Year (Men)
 Goalkeeper - Sterling Collier (Byron Bay)
 Defenders - Paul Kirkland (Goonellabah), Tony Duncombe (Byron Bay), Todd Gava (Italo Stars), Martin Scott (Lismore Thistles)
 Midfielders - Anthony Alvos (Lismore Workers), Darren Beardow (Lismore Thistles), Brad Bosworth (Lismore Workers), Damien Keevers (Goonellabah)
 Strikers - Troy Percival (Lismore Thistles), Wayne Mortimer (Casino)
 Coach - Jeff Hogan (Casino)

Referee of the Year
 Dick Nolan

Club Championship
 Bangalow

1996 Awards
Player of the Year (Premier League)
 Female - Tracy Want (Maclean)
 Male - Brett Towner (South Lismore)

Golden Boot
 Premier League (Female) - Tracy Want (Maclean) - ?
 Premier League (Male) - Matthew Olley (Goonellabah) - 31 goals
 Open (Female) - Sheree McGrath (Nimbin United) - ?
 Open (Male) - Rohan Coe (Casino) - ?

Premier League Team of the Year
 Goalkeeper - Teja Liebetreu (Nimbin Headers)
 Defenders - Rod Kirkland (Lismore Thistles), Matthew Walsh (Lismore Workers), Jason Toniello (Lismore Workers), Paul Wiltshire (Lismore Workers)
 Midfielders - Anthony Alvos (Lismore Workers), Brad Bosworth (Lismore Workers), Darren Beardow (Lismore Thistles), Brett Towner (South Lismore)
 Strikers - Matthew Olley (Goonellabah), Todd Franks (South Lismore)
 Coach - Robbie Armbruster (Richmond Rovers)

Referee of the Year
 Stuart Hase

Life Membership
 Doug Edwards

Club Championship
 Richmond Rovers

1995 Awards
Player of the Year (Premier League)
 Male - Matthew Bath (Goonellabah)

Golden Boot
 Premier League - Matthew Bath (Goonellabah) - 24 goals
 Open - Anthony Gaggin (Italo Stars) & Andre Real (Woodburn) - 23 goals

Team of the Year (Premier League)
 Goalkeeper - Adam Fittock (Goonellabah)
 Defenders - Matthew Lacey (Goonellabah), Jason Toniello (Lismore Workers), Paul Wilkshire (Lismore Workers), John Newton (Goonellabah)
 Midfielders - Anthony Alvos (Lismore Workers), Jim Phillips (Goonellabah), Scott Wilson (Goonellabah), Darren Beardow (Lismore Thistles)
 Strikers - Matthew Bath (Goonellabah), Brett Towner (South Lismore)
 Coach - Renato Cheli (Goonellabah)

Referee of the Year
 Paul Bartolo

Dedication to Soccer
 John Armstrong

1994 Awards
Player of the Year
 Darren Beardow (Lismore Thistles)Golden Boot Premier League - Jim Phillips (Goonellabah) - 13 goals
 Open - Perry LePetit (Alstonville) - 33 goalsCoach of the Year Renato Cheli (Goonellabah)Referee of the Year Paul BartoloDedication to Soccer Julie CliffordClub Championship Goonellabah

1993 AwardsPlayer of the Year (Premier League) Sam Tancred (Lismore Workers)Golden Boot Premier League - Brett Towner (South Lismore)
 Open - James Norris (Tintenbar)Coach of the Year (Premier League) Renato Cheli (Goonellabah)Referee of the Year Stuart HaseClub Championship Bangalow

1992 AwardsPlayer of the Year (Premier League) Paul Wiltshire (Lismore Workers)Golden Boot Premier League - Brett Towner (South Lismore) & Ian Hutchison (Lismore Thistles) - 13 goals
 Open - Stephen Bostock (Alstonville) - 26 goalsCoach of the Year (Premier League) Terry Woods (Lismore Thistles)Referee of the Year Glenn Gibbs (1st)Club Championship Ballina

1989 AwardsPlayer of the Year (Premier League) Tony Perkins (Richmond Rovers)Golden Boot Men (Premier League) - Stephen Fredericks (Italo Stars)
 Men (Open) - Daniel Parker (Kyogle)Coach of the Year Ken McPherson (Lismore Workers) & Jeff Hogan (Casino)Junior Player of the Year Darren Beardow (Lismore Thistles)

1984 AwardsCoach of the Year Wayne Ianna (Lismore Workers)

1983 AwardsPlayer of the Year (1st Division) - Coleman Trophy Ken McPherson (Eastwood United)Coach of the Year Lyle Wheeler (Bangalow)Referee of the Year Richard Morrissey

1982 AwardsPlayer of the Year - Coleman Trophy & Bert Mullins Prize Tony Roder (Lismore Thistles)

1981 AwardsPlayer of the Year - Coleman Trophy (Inaugural) & George Gooley Award Terry Woods (Lismore Thistles)Team of the Year'''
 Played Inter-Monaro in Lismore in October 1981. Inter-Monaro were a NSW State League side based in Queanbeyan, NSW.
 Glen Hart, Craig Kennedy, Bruce Harris, John Essex, Terry Woods (Lismore Thistles), Andrew Wilcox, Ian Layzell, Ken McPherson, Noel Fields, Laurie Carwadine, Robby Stevens, Ron Forder, Gordon Bryant, Glen Weir

See also
Football Federation Australia

References

External links
Official Website

Soccer in New South Wales
Soccer governing bodies in Australia
Northern Rivers